Epistrophy is an album of solo piano performances of material written by, or associated with, Thelonious Monk by the American jazz pianist Ran Blake recorded in 1991 and released on the Italian Soul Note label.

Reception
The Allmusic review by Scott Yanow awarded the album 3 stars stating "Ran Blake's re-interpretations of 12 Thelonious Monk songs and four standards that Monk enjoyed playing are quite different than everyone else's".

Track listing
All compositions by Thelonious Monk except as indicated
 "Epistrophy" (Kenny Clarke, Monk) - 3:08 
 "Thelonious" - 5:18 
 "April in Paris" (Vernon Duke, E. Y. Harburg) - 3:06 
 "Off Minor" - 1:39 
 "Criss-Cross" - 2:18 
 "Reflections" - 3:43 
 "Epistrophy" (Clarke, Monk) - 3:36 
 "'Round Midnight" - 5:50 
 "Hornin' In" - 0:56 
 "Just a Gigolo" (Julius Brammer, Leonello Casucci) - 3:10 
 "Nice Work If You Can Get It (George Gershwin, Ira Gershwin) - 3:46 
 "Ruby, My Dear" - 2:59 
 "Monk's Mood" - 5:12 
 "Smoke Gets in Your Eyes" (Otto Harbach, Jerome Kern) - 2:47 
 "Eronel" - 2:27 
 "Misterioso" - 3:08 
 "Epistrophy" (Clarke, Monk) - 1:17 
Recorded at Barigozzi Studio in Milano, Italy on April 19 & 20, 1991

Personnel
Ran Blake – piano

References

Black Saint/Soul Note albums
Ran Blake albums
Solo piano jazz albums
1991 albums